Pareuchaetes aurata is a moth of the subfamily Arctiinae. It was described by Arthur Gardiner Butler in 1875. It is found in Brazil, Argentina and Paraguay.

Subspecies
Pareuchaetes aurata aurata (Brazil, Argentina, Paraguay)
Pareuchaetes aurata aurantior Rothschild, 1922 (Brazil)

References

Phaegopterina
Moths described in 1875